Lords of the Storm is an original novel written by David A. McIntee and based on the long-running British science fiction television series Doctor Who. The novel features the Fifth Doctor and Turlough.

Plot
The Sontaran-Rutan war has gone on for millennia, and with high costs: Billions dead and whole star systems annihilated. However, victory may be within reach, courtesy of the human colony world of Raghi. When the Doctor and Turlough arrive there, they find a society ruled by a strict caste system. But there is more: people are being infected by a mysterious disease, or vanishing in large numbers while strange objects orbit the sun. How is this linked to the two warring races?

Sequel
The novelisation of Shakedown: Return of the Sontarans by Terrance Dicks, published as part of the Virgin New Adventures, forms a sequel to this novel.

1995 British novels
1995 science fiction novels
Virgin Missing Adventures
Fifth Doctor novels
Novels by David A. McIntee
Novels set on fictional planets
Novels set in the 24th century